Tore Strømøy  (born 13 April 1960) is a Norwegian journalist, television presenter and talk show host and former racewalker. He is best known for his talk show Tore på sporet which he hosted for 17 years between 1996 and 2013.

Strømøy qualified for the 50 km racewalk event at the 1980 Summer Olympics, but could never enter the competition as Norway followed US suit and boycotted the games.

Selected appearances
Go'fot på låven (1992)
På loffen (1994)
Tett på (1995) TV Series
Tore på sporet (1996 - 2006) TV Series 
Ja, vi elsker (1997) TV Series 
Lyden av lørdag (2007)

References

1960 births
Living people
Norwegian television presenters
Norwegian television talk show hosts
NRK people

Norwegian journalists
Norwegian male racewalkers
People from Sør-Trøndelag